General elections are scheduled to be held in Peru by 2026, with proposals to bring them forward to 2023 or 2024 due to the 2022–2023 Peruvian protests. The presidential elections, which will determine the president and the vice presidents, while the congressional elections will determine the composition of the Congress of Peru.

Electoral system 
The President is elected using the two-round system. The first round voting allows eligible voters to vote for any viable presidential candidate. The top two candidates who receive a plurality of the vote proceed to the run-off election. The winner of the run-off election and the presidential election is the candidate who receives a plurality of the popular vote. However, if in the first round the candidate who is in the first place already gets more than 50% of the popular vote, that candidate will automatically win the election and a run-off election will no longer be needed.

The 130 members of Congress are elected in 27 multi-member constituencies using open list proportional representation. To enter Congress, parties must either cross the 5% electoral threshold at the national level, or win at least seven seats in one constituency. Seats are allocated using the D'Hondt method.

Peru has five seats in the Andean Parliament, which are elected using a common constituency by open list proportional representation.

Potential presidential candidates

Declined 
 Rafael López Aliaga, mayor of Lima, presidential nominee in 2021, and president of Popular Renewal
 Keiko Fujimori, former First Lady of Peru, presidential nominee in 2011, 2016, and 2021, and president of Popular Force

Opinion polls

Presidential election

Notes

References

Presidential elections in Peru
Elections in Peru
Peru